Grahame-White was an early British aircraft manufacturer, flying school and later manufacturer of cyclecars.

The company was established as Grahame-White Aviation Company by Claude Grahame-White at Hendon in 1911. The firm built mostly aircraft of its own design, including the successful Type XV, but during World War I produced Morane-Saulnier types under licence for the British military. The company ceased aircraft manufacturing operations in 1920.

In the same year the company was renamed Grahame-White Company Ltd. and manufactured cyclecars until 1924 when the company ceased its operations completely.

Aircraft

 Grahame-White Baby
 Grahame-White Type VI
 Grahame-White Type VII Popular
 Grahame-White Type X Charabanc
 Grahame-White Type XI
 Grahame-White Type XIII Circuit of Britain biplane/scout
 Grahame-White Type XV
 Grahame-White Type 18
 Grahame-White G.W.19 (License-built Breguet Bre.5)
 Grahame-White Type 20 Scout (Prototype only)
 Grahame-White Type 21 Scout (Prototype only)
 Grahame-White Ganymede
 Grahame-White G.W.E.7
 Grahame-White Bantam

Cyclecars

From 1920 onwards a very basic two-seat 3.3 hp type with air-cooled single-cylinder engine of 348 cc capacity was offered. It had a two-speed transmission with final chain drive. The car had quarter elliptical spring suspension front and rear as well as flex in the wood frame and seat cushions. In 1921 a 7 hp type with a Coventry Victor twin-cylinder engine (capacity: 689 cc) and friction drive was added for one year only followed in 1924 by a four-cylinder 10 hp type with a Dorman engine of 1,094 cc, but very few were made. The final Angus-Sanderson cars were also made in the factory.

See also
 List of car manufacturers of the United Kingdom

References

 
 
 

Cyclecars
Defunct aircraft manufacturers of the United Kingdom
Defunct motor vehicle manufacturers of England
1911 establishments in England
British companies established in 1911
Vehicle manufacturing companies established in 1911
Vehicle manufacture in London